Pakistan–Somalia relations are the bilateral relations between Pakistan and Somalia. Both Organisation of Islamic Cooperation members, the two countries have historically maintained strong relations. Somalia also has an embassy in Islamabad.

History
Relations between the modern-day territories of Pakistan and Somalia stretch back to antiquity. The 1st century CE Periplus of the Erythraean Sea, among other documents, reports early commercial exchanges between traders inhabiting the various Somali city-states and merchants from South Asia, across the Arabian Sea. Numerous artefacts dating from this period have been uncovered in Somalia. During the 7th and 8th centuries, parts of Pakistan and Somalia came under the influence of the Umayyad and Abbasid Muslim caliphates. The expansion of the British Empire in the 19th century led to parts of modern Pakistan coming under the British Raj, while the Somaliland region became a protectorate under British Somaliland.

Diplomatic relations between the two countries post-independence were officially established on 18 December 1960, shortly after the formation of the Somali Republic. In 1969, Pakistan and Somalia were among the founding members of the Organisation of Islamic Cooperation (OIC). Somalia's relations with Pakistan remained strong in the following years and through the ensuing civil war period, when the Pakistani military contributed to a UN peacekeeping operation in southern Somalia. In 2010, Pakistan tabled a proposal for United Nations Security Council seats for OIC and Arab League states, the latter of which Somalia is also a member.

The Federal Government of Somalia was later established on August 20, 2012, representing the first permanent central government in the country since the start of the conflict. The development was welcomed by the Pakistani authorities, who re-affirmed Pakistan's continued support for Somalia's government, its territorial integrity and sovereignty, as outlined in the Islamabad Declaration adopted by the Islamic Conference of Foreign Ministers (ICFM).

Defence cooperation

During the Somali civil war in the 1990s, up to 5,700 Pakistani troops were deployed for UN peacekeeping. On 5 June 1993, a Pakistani task force was attacked while, as part of the expanded UN mandate, it was investigating an arms cache belonging to a Somali warlord vying for the Presidency, Mohamed Farrah Aidid; the attack, believed to have been launched by pro-Aidad militia, inflicted 24 casualties and led to Resolution 837, reaffirming the UN's commitment to peacekeeping and action against the rebels involved. Pakistan also became a member of the United Nations Contact Group on Piracy off the Coast of Somalia.

Due to a major increase in security and stability within Somalia and a major rebuilding effort around the armed forces and police already underway, the Somali Air Force and Pakistan Air Force's staff have signed training agreements in 2020 to educate and train Somalia's airmen, pilots and officers to enhance and strengthen the already large remilitarization campaign of Somalia within recent years.

Trade
Pakistan and Somalia are active commercial partners, trading a variety of commodities. In 2008–2009, Somalia exported $34,822.059 million USD worth of goods to Pakistan, with Pakistan in return exporting $17,781.883 million USD worth of goods to Somalia. Somalia's main export commodities to Pakistan centered on the country's livestock sector, and in 2009 included $3.190 million in raw hides and skins, $1.044 million in raw sheep and lamb skins, $0.137 million in sheep/lamb skin leather, $0.225 million in raw hides and skins of bovine/equine animals, and $0.033 million in leather of bovine/equine animals. Pakistan's exports to Somalia during the same year included $53.254 million in rice, $0.627 million in medicament mixtures, $10.400 million in non-cocoa sugar confectionery, and $0.20 million in shawls, scarves, mufflers, mantillas and similar garments.

Following a meeting between representatives of Somalia's Trade Ministry and the Islamabad Chamber of Commerce and Industry, the two countries agreed to enhance their commercial relations, particularly in the agriculture, food products, livestock, fish farming, textiles, pharmaceutical products, leather products, hides and cement sectors. Most of the trade between Somalia and Pakistan had hitherto been conducted through Dubai, so the Somali authorities sought to establish direct trade links with Pakistan. According to Somalia's former Trade Minister Abdi Rashid Mohamed Abdi, Somalia wanted to purchase products that it had been importing from elsewhere directly from Pakistan. He also highlighted Somalia's commercial potential given its strategic location and its position as a gateway to African markets, and suggested that Pakistan could capture large parts of Somalia's markets were it to supply quality products at competitive prices.

Immigration
As of late 2012, there is a small community of around 2,500 Somalis in Pakistan. Most are international students, with a few secondary migrants also present. Additionally, there was a very small community of Pakistanis in Somalia. They were mainly involved in retail business in urban areas.

Diplomatic missions

Somalia maintains an embassy in Islamabad which was established in 1976. The diplomatic mission is led by Ambassador Khadija Mohamed Almakhzoumi. H.E. Mrs. Khadija Mohamed Almakhzoumi, Ambassador of the Federal Republic of Somalia to Pakistan, Presented her credentials to H.E. Mr. Mamnoon Hussain, President of the Islamic Republic of Pakistan, on July 14, 2016. Before her arrival to Pakistan, Ambassador Khadija was a counselor in Somali Embassy Malaysia from February 2011 to June 2011 and senior political Advisor to Minister of Foreign Affairs Somalia from September 2011 to January 2013. She served as the Somali Ambassador to Iraq from February 2013 to April 2016. Ambassador Khadija earned post graduate degree in International Relations from Middlesex University, London UK. It also has an honorary consulate in Karachi. Pakistan previously had an embassy in Mogadishu, which was established in 1973.

See also

 Foreign relations of Pakistan
 Foreign relations of Somalia

References

External links
Embassy of the Federal Republic of Somalia in Pakistan

 
Somalia
Bilateral relations of Somalia
Somalia